
Year 384 BC was a year of the pre-Julian Roman calendar. At the time, it was known as the Year of the Tribunate of Cornelius, Poplicola, Camillus, Rufus, Crassus and Capitolinus (or, less frequently, year 370 Ab urbe condita). The denomination 384 BC for this year has been used since the early medieval period, when the Anno Domini calendar era became the prevalent method in Europe for naming years.

Events 
 By place 

 Greece 
 Lysias, the Athenian orator, on the occasion of the Olympiad, rebukes the Greeks for allowing themselves to be dominated by the Syracusan tyrant Dionysius I and by the barbarian Persians.
 The Greeks found the colony of Pharos at the site of today’s Stari Grad on the island of Hvar, defeating Iadasinoi warriors brought in for its defense.

Births 
 Aristotle, Greek philosopher (d. 322 BC)
 Demosthenes, Greek statesman and orator (d. 322 BC)

Deaths

References